Hashim Uddin Ahmed is a Jatiya Party (Ershad) politician and the former Member of Parliament of Mymensingh-8.

Career
In the early 1950s, Ahmed worked to remove Sheikh Mujibur Rahman from the post of general secretary of the Awami League. He was aided by Abdus Salam Khan, Khairat Hossain, and Almas Ali. Ahmed was a member of the East Pakistan Assembly in 1957. He was elected to parliament from Mymensingh-8 as a Jatiya Party candidate in 1986.

References

Jatiya Party politicians
Living people
3rd Jatiya Sangsad members
Year of birth missing (living people)